Diapriinae is a subfamily of parasitoid wasps.

Taxonomy

Diapriinae contains three tribes: Diapriini, Psilini and Spilomicrini. The subfamily also contains the following genera:

 Aneurhynchus
 Antarctopria
 Antropria
 Aulacopria
 Caecopria
 Calogalesus
 Cerapsilon
 Cordylocras
 Cyathopria
 Erasikea
 Eunuchopria
 Geodiapria
 Hemilexomyia
 Lepidopria
 Malvina
 Oxypria
 Peckidium
 Plagiopria
 Probetyla
 Solenopsia
 Symphytopria
 Termitopria
 Tetramopria
 Valia

References

Parasitica
Parasitic wasps
Diapriidae
Taxa described in 1833
Apocrita subfamilies